The canton of Meslay-du-Maine is an administrative division of the Mayenne department, northwestern France. Its borders were modified at the French canton reorganisation which came into effect in March 2015. Its seat is in Meslay-du-Maine.

It consists of the following communes:
 
Arquenay
Bannes
La Bazouge-de-Chemeré
Bazougers
Beaumont-Pied-de-Bœuf
Le Bignon-du-Maine
Blandouet-Saint Jean
Bouère
Bouessay
Le Buret
La Chapelle-Rainsouin
Chémeré-le-Roi
Cossé-en-Champagne
La Cropte
Grez-en-Bouère
Maisoncelles-du-Maine
Meslay-du-Maine
Préaux
Ruillé-Froid-Fonds
Saint-Brice
Saint-Charles-la-Forêt
Saint-Denis-du-Maine
Sainte-Suzanne-et-Chammes
Saint-Georges-le-Fléchard
Saint-Léger
Saint-Loup-du-Dorat
Saint-Pierre-sur-Erve
Saulges
Thorigné-en-Charnie
Torcé-Viviers-en-Charnie
Vaiges
Val-du-Maine
Villiers-Charlemagne

References

Cantons of Mayenne